Tembo Tabou, written by Franquin and Greg, drawn by Franquin and Jean Roba, is the twenty-fourth album of the Spirou et Fantasio series, and the twentieth under Franquin's authorship. The story was initially serialised in Le Parisien Libéré in 1959, and later in Spirou magazine, before it was published, along with the Marsupilami story La Cage, as a hardcover album in 1974.

Story
In Tembo Tabou, Spirou and Fantasio find themselves on another expedition travelling upstream an African river, in search of vanished American author Oliver Gurgling Thirstywell. Events become increasingly more strange when they discover red elephants, befriend a pygmy tribe, learn of Marsupilami's love of eating warrior ants, and confront a gang of "protection racket" thugs who cultivate meat-eating plants.

The story The Cage chronicles an awful day at work for intrepid poacher Bring M. Backalive, obsessed with capturing a living sample of a baby Marsupilami, who learns the cost of angering a Marsupilami father.

Background
The title story of this album was produced in the period between the making of Spirou et les hommes-bulles and QRN sur Bretzelburg.

Trivia
In the 1970s, Swedish publishing house Carlsen Comics deemed the story's contents to be racially offensive, and the album was never published in Sweden. However, it was published in Denmark by Interpresse.
The story was later published in Sweden in book form, included in the collected series of Franquin's Spirou.

References

 Franquin publications in Spirou BDoubliées 
Footnotes

External links
 Spirou official site album index 
 Franquin site album index 

Comics by André Franquin
Spirou et Fantasio albums
1974 graphic novels
1974 in comics
Comics set in Africa
Works originally published in Le Parisien
Literature first published in serial form